The End is an Australian television drama series that premiered on Fox Showcase and Sky Atlantic in February 2020. The 10-part series was created and written by Samantha Strauss and produced by See-Saw Films. It was directed by Jessica M. Thompson and Jonathan Brough and stars Frances O'Connor, Harriet Walter and Noni Hazlehurst.

The End centres around three generations of family trying their best to navigate how to live meaningfully and die with dignity. The show was praised for its depiction of ageing and exploration of complex themes including euthanasia and suicide. The inspiration for the show came from Strauss's experience watching her grandmother go through life changes after moving into a retirement village she thought she would hate.

Synopsis
Australian doctor Kate Brennan (Frances O'Connor), a senior registrar specialising in palliative care medicine, is passionate in her opposition to euthanasia. Her mother, Edie Henley (Harriet Walter) who lives in England, is just as passionate about her right to die. After an incident occurs, Kate must bring Edie out to Australia to be closer to the family. Edie is placed in a nearby retirement village, which is her worst nightmare. Kate struggles with her own problems and children, while trying to find a way back to a relationship with her mother.

Cast and characters

 Frances O'Connor as Dr Kate Brennan
 Harriet Walter as Edie Henley
 Noni Hazlehurst as Pamela Hardy
 Luke Arnold  as Josh
Ingrid Torelli as Persephone Brennan
Morgan Davies as Oberon Brennan
Alex Dimitriades as Dr Nikos Naoumidis
John Waters as Henry
Robyn Nevin as Dawn
Roy Billing as Art
Diane McLean as Iris
Kate Peters as Mary
Andrea Demetriades as Dr Philippa Lee
Uli Latukefu as Greg the Nurse
Sebastien Thornton-Walker as Jasper
Brooke Satchwell as Beth
Flin Purnama as Colin Rossiter
Brendan Cowell as Christopher Brennan

Themes

Euthanasia
The End explores the topic of euthanasia and what it means to die with dignity. Euthanasia in Australia has been subject to significant political and public debate. At the time of the show's creation, Queensland, where the show takes place, was the only state in Australia to have not considered any bills relating to Voluntary Assisted Dying. Since the show's release, Queensland has introduced legislation surrounding Euthanasia. The Voluntary Assisted Dying Act 2021 is scheduled to come into effect in 2023.

In the first episode Kate is faced with a moral dilemma, when she is made aware of her patient Beth's (Brooke Satchwell) intention to have a voluntary assisted death. Beth and her husband Josh (Luke Arnold) ask Kate to test the illegal drug they had acquired to ensure its safety when they learn of Kate's strong opposition to euthanasia. "I hate that argument. She's not a dog" is Kate's response when Josh compares the situation to putting down a suffering animal. Later, Kate is seen killing an injured bat in her backyard to end its pain.

Suicide
Suicide appears many times throughout the show. The End opens with a depressed Edie Henley's unsuccessful attempt to end her own life. As the show continues, so does Edie's attempts, as she struggles to find meaning in her life after her husband's death and the discovery of his previous infidelities. It is revealed that Oberon (Morgan Davies) has recently attempted to end his own life, which brings his relationship with Edie closer. The portrayal of suicide in media has been found to have a positive impact on suicide awareness and help-seeking behaviour.

Episodes

International release
In United States, the series premiered on July 18, 2021, on Showtime. It is also available to stream on Crave in Canada as of July 18, 2021.

Reception

Critical response
Rotten Tomatoes, a review aggregator, reported an average approval rating of 76% based on 16 critics, with an average rating of 7.2/10. The website's critic consensus reads "The End's cynical take on life and death may not be as deep as it thinks itself to be, but sharp performances and a few genuinely surprising insights almost make up for it". On Metacritic, it holds a weighted average mark of 59 out of 100 based on 8 critics.

Globally the show received mixed reviews. One review for the Boston Globe reported that the storyline is "too dense at times" but the shows writing is "consistently perceptive". A review for Variety reports the show "can't quite find its tone" but also praises the performance of Harriet Walter and Frances O'Connor for having a "purifying effect". Writing in Roger Ebert, Brian Tallerico criticises the depth of the shows writing, stating that some scenes felt "over-scripted" and "superficial"

The Wrap calls The End  "an engrossing watch", praising the way the show presents the complex conversations surrounding life and death and the performance of the cast. The review also writes that some of the writers decisions could have been different to allow the show to come together more meaningfully.

Awards and nominations
 AACTA Award, nomination, for Best Miniseries (2021)  
 AACTA Award, nomination, Noni Hazlehurst, for Best Supporting Actress in a Drama for her role as Pamela Hardy.

References

External links

2020 Australian television series debuts
2020s Australian drama television series
English-language television shows
Showcase (Australian TV channel) original programming
Suicide in television